The men's 800 metres competition of the athletics events at the 2019 Pan American Games will take place between the 9 and 10 of August at the 2019 Pan American Games Athletics Stadium. The defending Pan American Games champion is Clayton Murphy from the United States.

Records
Prior to this competition, the existing world and Pan American Games records were as follows:

Schedule

Results
All times shown are in seconds.

Semifinal
The heats took place on 9 August at 15:50. The results were as follows:
Qualification: First 3 in each heat (Q) and the next 2 fastest (q) advance to the Final

Final
The final took place on 10 August at 14:55. The results were as follows:

References

Athletics at the 2019 Pan American Games
2019